Superliga Femenina de Voleibol 2014–15 was the 46th season since its establishment. This season comprises regular season, 2nd phase and Final. Regular season started on October 11, 2014, and 2nd phase matches finished on April 18, 2015.

Naturhouse Ciudad de Logroño and GH Leadernet Navarcable played the Championship Final to the best of three matches.

Defending champions Naturhouse Ciudad de Logroño won its second title in a row after defeating GH Leadernet Navarcable 3–0 in the Final.

Teams

Regular season standings

|}

2nd phase standings

Group A

|}

Group B

|}

Final

Match 1

|}

Match 2

|}

Match 3

|}

Top scorers
(This statistics includes regular season and playoff matches.)

References

External links
Official website

1ªFemale
2014 in women's volleyball
2014 in Spanish sport
2015 in women's volleyball
2015 in Spanish sport